The Wolfe City Group is a geologic group in Texas. It preserves fossils dating back to the Cretaceous period.

See also

 List of fossiliferous stratigraphic units in Texas
 Paleontology in Texas

References
 

Geologic groups of Texas
Cretaceous System of North America